Grande Fratello 3 is the third season of the Italian version of the reality show franchise Big Brother. The show began on 30 January 2003 and concluded on 8 May 2003. Barbara D'Urso as the main host of the show for the first time.

Production
It marked a turning point in the way the show was produced when compared to previous seasons.

House
The size of the house was increased to almost  and was made almost entirely of glass.

Nomination
This year the nominations process was changed. Unlike previous years, this year the Housemates would each week nominate three of their fellow Housemates for eviction rather than two as in previous years.

Luxury Suite
In this season, a luxury suite was introduced. It's a soft room filled with every luxury that the Housemates were not allowed in the main house. Every week the winner of a task would be allowed access to this room, along with one Housemate of their choice. The winner of this task was also allowed to purchase some gifts for themselves or their companion, from the prize fund (up to 300,000 euros this year).

Housemates
Twelve Housemates entered the Big Brother House on opening night, with four Housemates joining later.

Nominations table

Notes 
 : On Day 1, Erika and Marika were nominated by Big Brother. Their fellow housemates voted and Erika was evicted.
 : On Day 8, Massimo and Raffaello entered the house and the public had to vote for one of them to stay.
 : Victoria won the weekly task and chose Pasquale to be immune from nomination.
 : Pasquale won the weekly task and chose Victoria to be immune from nomination.
 : Floriana won the weekly task and chose herself to be immune from nomination.
 : After Fedro left the house after learning of his aunt's death, the eviction this week was cancelled.
 : Couple Franco and Manila entered the house together, and after a week had to choose one of them to leave. Manila chose to be the one to leave and left the house immediately.
 : This week, the public was voting for who they wanted to win, rather than to evict.

TV Ratings 

2003 Italian television seasons
03